"Break Up Song" is a song by British girl group Little Mix. It was released on March 27, 2020, and serves as the lead single from the group's sixth studio album Confetti (2020). The group co wrote the song a year before it was chosen as the album's lead single with Frank Nobel and producers Kamille and Goldfingers. Break Up Song received positive reviews from critics who described it as a synth-pop track with influences of 1980s pop music. The song addresses themes of heartbreak, and independence with lyrics about over-coming an ex and celebrating independence.

Composition
Little Mix members Perrie Edwards, Leigh-Anne Pinnock and Jade Thirlwall wrote "Break Up Song" with Frank Nobel, and producers Kamille and Goldfingers. According to Thirlwall, they wrote the song more than a year prior to its release with 1980s pop music and an element of nostalgia in mind, similar to that of their 2015 single "Black Magic". Edwards, Pinnock and Thirlwall composed it during a whirl of creativity where they wrote seven songs with Kamille in one day, after having only one melody from a frustrating previous session. The track's 1980s sound stemmed from a synthesiser they dabbled with in the studio.

A different song was initially chosen as their sixth album's lead single with an accompanying music video already filmed. However, the group opted for "Break Up Song" at the last minute after hearing the demo again during a playback session. The demo had only one verse and main line. Edwards described it as "very basic at the time. The beat was all over the place and it was really, really rough - but it just had something about it." Thirlwall recalled, "We got that jittery feeling that we had with "Shout Out to My Ex" and "Black Magic" where it just felt special."

Thirlwall described the track as "a very feel-good kind of empowerment song about going out and just forgetting about all your woes and troubles". It was also called an "80s-synth pop anthem" about "getting over the end of a relationship".

Critical reception 
Glenn Rowley from Billboard described the song as an "80s-inspired anthem that see the members celebrate their independence after ditching the deadbeat men in their lives... the foursome sing over danceable pop production on the track's pulsating chorus." Lewis Corner from Gay Times, wrote "The group are back with an 80s-tinged pop anthem that’ll swoop you out of your isolation blues. Break Up Song is a whopper of a return, pairing love-lorn lyrics with sky-soaring synths."

Attitude said "After teasing the start of a new musical era, Little Mix are back today with retro-tinged, synth-slick track 'Break Up Song' – and it's making us reach for the legwarmers. As the name implies, it's a track about relationships that didn't last, and the aftermath that comes with them." MTV wrote "Little Mix officially launched a new era on Friday with the shimmering, shake-him-off anthem 'Break Up Song.' It's a high-gloss single that fuses the perkiness of 'Black Magic' and the blissful liberation of 'Shout Out To My Ex'." i said "Break Up Song is an 80s electro-pop opener that encapsulates the jubilant energy found throughout".

Year-end lists

Promotion
A Little Mix-themed filter on Instagram was made available to the group's followers to promote the track. The song was released on 27 March 2020 and on the same day a Spotify vertical video and a lyric video were both released. The latter was made by Kayleigh, a fan of the band from the Netherlands.

Music video 
Little Mix announced the official music video for the song on 7 May 2020 on their social media, and it was released a day later at 9am BST. The music video, directed by Zac Ella, was semi-animated, as the planned video shoot for the song had to be cancelled due to the COVID-19 pandemic. The group filmed portions of the video at home using the original concept. The animation of the video displayed felt fabric texture to depict the band. In the video, the animated part was focused on the group hosting a Good Morning Britain-style breakfast show on a television channel called LM TV. Leigh- Anne Pinnock is presented as a news reporter, while Jesy Nelson presents the weather forecast. Perrie Edwards is presented as a fitness mentor, while Jade Thirlwall tackles the latest fashion, with each of them having their own segment in their respective verses of the song. The video also includes real-life clips of the band dancing to the song while dressed in different styles of 80's clothing.

Live performances
On 21 August 2020, Little Mix performed "Break Up Song" for the first time as part of the set list for their Little Mix Uncancelled concert. The song was later performed on the eighteenth series of Strictly Come Dancing in December 2020, with member Jesy Nelson absent from the performance. The song was also performed on their seventh concert tour The Confetti Tour in 2022.

Track listing
Digital download and streaming
 "Break Up Song" – 3:20

Digital download and streaming – acoustic
 "Break Up Song"  – 3:22

Digital download and streaming – Nathan Dawe remix
 "Break Up Song"  – 3:21

Digital download and streaming – Steve Void remix
 "Break Up Song"  – 2:57

Streaming – Break Up Song – EP
 "Break Up Song" – 3:20
 "Break Up Song"  – 3:22
 "Break Up Song"  – 3:21
 "Break Up Song"  – 2:57

Personnel
Credits adapted from Qobuz.

Jesy Nelson – vocals
Leigh-Anne Pinnock – vocals, songwriting 
Jade Thirlwall – vocals, songwriting 
Perrie Edwards – vocals, songwriting 
Kamille – production, keyboards, vocal production, bass, background vocals
Goldfingers – production, drums, keyboards, programming
Raphaella Mazaheri-Asadi – vocal production 
Frank Nobel – drums, keyboards, programming
Phil Tan – mixing 
Paul Norris – engineering
Bill Zimmerman – engineering assistance 
Randy Merrill – mastering

Commercial performance 
"Break Up Song" reached the top ten of the Australian, Euro and Switzerland Digital Sales Charts. It reached the top ten of the charts in Belgium, Hungary, New Zealand, Netherlands and the UK, becoming the Little Mix's fifteenth top ten single in the country. It also reached the markets in six other countries including Ireland, Greece, and Portugal. According to Official Charts, Break Up Song was ranked as one of the best selling songs of 2020, placing at number 33 on their list. It has since been certified platinum by the British Phonographic Industry (BPI) and certified gold by the Pro-Música Brasil (PMB).

Charts

Weekly charts

Year-end charts

Certifications

Release history

See also
 List of UK top-ten singles in 2020

References

External links
 
 
 
 
 

2020 singles
2020 songs
Little Mix songs
Songs about heartache
Songs written by Kamille (musician)
Vertically-oriented music videos